is the main protagonist of the manga series The Promised Neverland, created by Kaiu Shirai and Posuka Demizu. Emma is an 11-year-old girl living at Grace Field House. She consistently gets perfect scores on her daily exams. She is the life of the party and a quick learner. She is known for her ample optimism as well as her capable athleticism, but she can also be crazy at times. Upon discovering the truth of the orphanage, Emma teams up with Norman and Ray to escape the house. She loves her family more than anything and her strong sense of selflessness insists that everyone escape together, even if most of their siblings are below 6 years old, an aim which Ray deems crazy and plain reckless.

In the anime adaptation, she is voiced by Sumire Morohoshi in Japanese, and by Erica Mendez in the English version. In the live-action film adaptation, she is portrayed by Minami Hamabe.

Emma has ranked highly in various awards and polls. In 2019, she was awarded the Best Female Character at the 41st Anime Grand Prix. She was also praised for her gender, original design, character development and for breaking the typical mold of a feminine protagonist.

Creation

According to the author Kaiu Shirai, he avoided making her too plain. Whether it is a character’s thoughts and hopes, the thrill of the story or solving the mysteries. Shirai made Emma as a female protagonist because the first antagonist of the story, Isabella, is also a female, thinking that the mother-daughter relationship between the two would make the story "more interesting". She had two options, weather escape with her siblings or become a mother in Grace Field House. He further said that she is not a boy and does not have extraordinary physical abilities nor special powers, that breaks the Shōnen Jump mold of protagonist. Shirai describes Emma as energetic, "like light," kind of motherly, and idealistic. She keeps the balance between Norman, who supports her, and Ray, who argues but helps anyway.

Posuka Demizu described the creation of the character as "the story of The Promised Neverland needed a different kind of main protagonist", like Emma, so she came naturally. Demizu further explained that it was not necessary for her to follow the Jump style. Demizu also said that Emma is one of the hardest characters to draw, as drawing her for every panel takes the most time to finish.

Casting
In the anime adaptation, the character is voiced by Sumire Morohoshi in Japanese. Erica Mendez voices the character in English. In the live-action film adaptation, she was portrayed by Minami Hamabe.

Appearances

In The Promised Neverland
Being one of the smartest children living at the orphanage , Emma is considered as one of Grace Field House Plant 3's three "Premium quality goods" along with Norman and Ray. She was born on August 22, 2034. She has green eyes and short light orange hair that sticks up in all angles around her head with a single long lock of hair curving upwards from the right side of her head, resembling an antenna, and another smaller one from the base of her neck. Like Ray and Norman, Emma consistently gets perfect scores on her daily exams at the Grace Field House orphanage. At the beginning of the story on October 12, 2045, Emma is 11-year-old, she wears the uniform of Grace Field House: a shirt, a white skirt and brown shoes. An authentication number, 63194 is tattooed on her neck.

During the escape from the orphanage, she cut off her right ear to prevent Isabella from finding them, in which she wore a bandage to cover the wound the whole time. After her adventure at the demon world, she wears various outfits more suited to adventure and exploration.

Appearances in other media
Emma appeared in two drama CDs released along with the anime series' first season Blu-ray disc, titled GF House Ghost Disturbance and Gift from the 39th Girl. The stories were originated from the novel A Letter from Norman.

Another two drama CDs that explores other aspects of Emma's life in Grace Field House, titled The day Emma cried and Voice Time Capsule, were also released along with the anime series' second season Blu-ray disc.

Good Smile Company launched a Nendoroid figure based on the character from the series in September 2019. Emma is a playable character in the mobile game The Promised Neverland: Escape the Hunting Grounds released on iOS and Android. Emma is also a playable character in the crossover collaborations between The Promised Neverland and the smartphone video games Identity V, Jumputi Heroes, Dragon Egg, Vivid Army and LINE POP 2.

Reception

Popularity
Emma was awarded the Best Female Character at the 41st Anime Grand Prix in 2019. She was nominated for the Best Girl and Best Protagonist of the Year at the 4th Crunchyroll Anime Awards in 2020. She was also nominated for the Girl of the Year category in the 6th Anime Trending Awards in 2020. Emma achieved the 2nd place behind Norman in the Color Illustration Character Poll of the series in 2018. In the popularity poll of the series in 2018, Emma is in the 1st place. She also took the first place in the 2nd popularity poll of the series, with a total of 5581 votes.

Critical response
Emma has received widespread critical acclaim from professionals in the industry, writers, reviewers and critics. Aya Kikuchi from the Japanese website Real Sound described her as: She is a girl and the main character, is the reason why The Promised Neverland is serialized in Weekly Shōnen Jump, and I consider her to be a symbol. In this story, Emma is portrayed as a girl who fulfills the conditions of the hero image. But it is not just her gender that makes her look like a new hero. Emma is also reckless and daredevil, but she is not "stupid". As you can see from the setting that she is an excellent child who clears super-difficult tests every day, Emma is a brain with extraordinary physical ability. She has a naive and mood maker side, but she can see the difficulties that are far ahead from the beginning. Death that exists next to each other, a situation in which a small mistake by one person can lead to many casualties, and children who are always in danger. All the factors are in demons, and they have been portrayed as hateful things. However, as Emma learns about the world of demons, she can no longer ignore the fact that they have the same life as her. She wonders if there is a difference between her hunting and eating beasts and demons eating humans. And the story moves towards the final phase centering on Norman, who wants to annihilate the demons, and Emma, who does not want neither humans nor demons to die. The Promised Neverland has ended, but it is not too late to get addicted to this world that gave birth to a new jump hero". Emma was also well received by the professor of global Japanese studies at Meiji University, Yukari Fujimoto and by the manga artist Morizono Milk, which both highlighted the good fact to have a female protagonist in a manga published in Weekly Shōnen Jump; with Morizonu stating "I knew that this work was serialized in shōnen Jump magazine, but I did not know that Yukari Fujimoto pointed out that this is the first manga that has a girl as the main character in this way. In that sense as well, I think the achievement of this manga, in which the main character is Emma was a big hit, it is great". The scholar of British and American literature Kei Toda explained that Emma is "unlike a so-called feminine heroine", and at the same time "she can not be described as completely boyish either". Toda said that Emma is a "character depicted with both masculine and feminine elements", she also praised the character for being a unique heroine.

Rebecca Silverman from Anime News Network praised her strong role in the storyline of the series, and stated "Emma herself stands to be a very strong figure. She has the heart needed to get things done. She is the one who refuses to leave anyone behind, the one who understands that family is important, and ultimately the person who does the most growing even over the course of just one book. To say that Emma is the ray of light in this very dark story might be understating things a bit". Allen Moody of THEM Anime Reviews enjoyed the personality of Emma and describes her as "Emma, though, is the steadfast one- resolute, indomitable, yet compassionate, someone who can be bent by grief but is hard to actually break, someone whose toughness of spirit endures despite some devastating developments, a true leader and one of the most admirable characters I have come across in anime". Brittany Vincent for Syfy simply described Emma as "The lead protagonist of the series, Emma, hardly looks like your typical anime character at all, thanks to her shock of reddish, blonde hair and her wide eyes". Tina Marie DeLucia from the Screen Rant website describes Emma as a young and cheerful protagonist, she also said that Emma has all the qualities of a lead: a drive, a devotion to a cause or family, and the desire to better the world and herself. She offers the “promise” of new genres of protagonists.

The french website Melty prised her development through the whole manga, especially at the Goldy Pond and 7 Walls story arcs, saying that it had a huge impact on the development and environment of the story. Pauline Croquet from the french newspaper Le Monde said that the design of the three main characters, including Emma, is very original and comes out of the shōnen manga typical designs; and prised how the creators handled her character development and personality. Vincent Jule of the french newspaper 20 minutes praised her role as one of a few female main characters of a manga published in a shōnen magazine. Explaining that "manga heroines were mostly shōjo heroines, and if they managed to find a place in a shônen magazine, it was most often with masculine attributes: the badass, the fight and sometimes the sexy". He further said that Emma has changed this situation, by her unique character design, leadership and good charactization, that makes her stand out from the other characters. Flavien Appavou from the french website EcranLarge said that her "face and her conviction allow you to bond with her very quickly", and "it is through her personality that the manga finds its originality". He also described her as an original character that does not look like a typical main character at all.

See also

 List of The Promised Neverland characters

References

External links
  
  

Child characters in anime and manga
Comics characters introduced in 2016
Fantasy anime and manga characters
Female characters in anime and manga
Fictional orphans
Orphan characters in anime and manga